The Mysterious Mister X (German: Der geheimnisvolle Mister X) is a 1936 German comedy film directed by J.A. Hübler-Kahla and starring Ralph Arthur Roberts, Annemarie Steinsieck and Herti Kirchner.

The film's sets were designed by the art director Gustav A. Knauer and Alexander Mügge.

Synopsis
A British lord, fascinated by crime, spends his time collecting artefacts. He is thrilled when he receives mysterious letters warning that a thief plans to steal a valuable statue from his country house. His secretary persuades him to bring in her fiancée, a private detective, to investigate the case.

Cast
 Ralph Arthur Roberts as Lord Wilford 
 Mady Rahl as Nelly Taylor, Sekretärin 
 Annemarie Steinsieck as Lady Wilford 
 Herti Kirchner as Lilian, ihre Tochter 
 Curt Ackermann as James - ihr Neffe 
 Hermann Thimig as Richard Murray 
 Eugen Rex as Smith, Kunsthändler 
 Robert Jungk as Duncan - Hausmeister auf Schloß Wilford 
 Erwin Biegel as Williams - Diener auf Schloß Wilford 
 Willi Schur as Der Nachtwächter auf Schloß Wilford

Other film versions
 (1938)
 (1940)

References

Bibliography 
 Waldman, Harry. Nazi Films in America, 1933–1942. McFarland, 2008.

External links 
 

1936 films
1930s comedy mystery films
1930s crime comedy films
German crime comedy films
Films of Nazi Germany
1930s German-language films
Films directed by Johann Alexander Hübler-Kahla
Films set in England
German films based on plays
Tobis Film films
1936 comedy films
1930s German films